"For All Debts Public and Private" is the 40th episode of the HBO television series The Sopranos and the first episode of the show's fourth season. Written by David Chase and directed by Allen Coulter, it originally aired on September 15, 2002.

Starring
 James Gandolfini as Tony Soprano
 Lorraine Bracco as Dr. Jennifer Melfi 
 Edie Falco as Carmela Soprano
 Michael Imperioli as Christopher Moltisanti
 Dominic Chianese as Corrado Soprano, Jr.
 Steven Van Zandt as Silvio Dante
 Tony Sirico as Paulie Gualtieri
 Robert Iler as Anthony Soprano, Jr. 
 Jamie-Lynn Sigler as Meadow Soprano
 Drea de Matteo as Adriana La Cerva
 Aida Turturro as Janice Soprano
 Federico Castelluccio as Furio Giunta
 Vincent Curatola as Johnny Sack
 Steven R. Schirripa as Bobby Baccalieri
 Joe Pantoliano as Ralph Cifaretto

Guest starring

Synopsis
Concerned about money, Junior meets with Tony at his doctor's office, asking for more help for his medical and legal expenses. However, Tony angrily tells Junior to manage his affairs better, concerned with his own affairs. Later, Junior promotes Bobby Baccalieri. Assemblyman Ron Zellman tells Tony that Junior owns a property in a special development district in Newark which is going to rise in value, and Tony buys the property, under the guise of doing his uncle a favor. Afterwards, he calls a meeting with the family's capos in which he criticizes the lack of growth in their businesses.

Carmela begins to worry about her finances after seeing Angie Bonpensiero working at a supermarket. Tony insists that she and the children will be provided for if anything happens to him, and also claims he is no longer hiding money in their house, but later hides packets of money in a tub of duck feed.

Paulie is arrested in Youngstown, Ohio, on a gun charge, and is upset at Tony's apparent indifference. In prison, he calls Johnny Sack, who cultivates his dissatisfaction.

Ralphie and Janice are growing closer. Ralphie comes to a Sunday dinner at Tony and Carmela's home with Rosalie Aprile, but Janice later joins him in the bathroom for cocaine and sex.

Christopher, believing that Tony is treating him harshly because he questioned his action against Jackie Aprile, Jr., begins using heroin again. He complains about the constant presence of Adriana's close friend Danielle, unaware she is actually undercover FBI Agent Ciccerone. Meanwhile, Junior learns that there was an undercover agent in his doctor's office, and he believes it was the nurse he was flirting with and is mortified that he failed to suspect her.

Speaking to Dr. Melfi about business with unusual frankness, Tony discusses his plans to use Christopher as a proxy in order to avoid jail time or death. In an attempt to bond with Christopher, Tony gives him the name and home address of a recently retired policeman who Tony claims killed Christopher's father. Christopher goes to the man's home and kills him.

First appearances
Bobby Baccalieri, III: Bobby's son
Karen Baccalieri: Bobby's wife
Sophia Baccalieri: Bobby's daughter
Carlo Gervasi: Soprano/DiMeo crime family capo
Murf Lupo: Aging former Soprano/DiMeo crime family capo and friend of Junior Soprano
Cosette: the dog of Adriana La Cerva

Deceased
Det. Lt. Barry Haydu: shot dead in his home by Christopher Moltisanti to avenge Dickie Moltisanti's murder.

Title reference
 The episode's title is taken from a phrase found on American paper currency: "this note is legal tender for all debts, public and private". The episode ends with a close-up of a twenty-dollar bill that Christopher takes from Lt. Barry Haydu after he kills him—the only episode in the series to not fade to a black screen.

Production
 This episode was the first to be produced and aired after the September 11, 2001 terrorist attacks. From this episode on, the shot of the World Trade Center towers in the opening credits is absent, replaced by additional shots of industrial scenery before reaching the toll booth.
 Vince Curatola (Johnny Sack) is now billed in the opening credits, but only for the episodes in which he appears.
 A comment made by Carmine Lupertazzi to Tony Soprano, "A don doesn't wear shorts", was added into the show after series creator David Chase was contacted by a supposed real-life mafia associate who praised him on the authenticity of the show, with the exception that Tony often wears shorts, which he said a real don would never do. 
 "For All Debts Public and Private" is one of only two Sopranos episodes in which the end credits roll on top of a picture (the eye of the twenty-dollar bill in this case) instead of a black background (the other episode is "Cold Cuts" from Season 5) and the only episode in which they do so for the entire duration of the credits.

Other cultural references
 Bobby Baccala mentions the September 11 attacks in 2001 as a factor of his 69-year-old mother's deteriorating mental health.
 Bobby subsequently claims that "Quasimodo predicted all this", mistaking The Hunchback of Notre-Dame'''s main protagonist for Nostradamus, whose supporters believe accurately predicted many major world events.
 Junior is shown watching the movie Heaven Knows, Mr. Allison.
 During the scene in which Carmela approaches Tony about finances, the movie playing on the television is Rio Bravo, a 1959 Western starring John Wayne, Dean Martin and Ricky Nelson. In the scene that Tony is watching, Martin and Nelson sing a duet, "My Rifle, My Pony and Me". This song is also used at the end of the future episode "Pie-O-My."
 At Lt. Haydu's house, Chris is shown watching the Magnum P.I. episode "No More Mr. Nice Guy."
 When Paulie is on the payphone in county jail, The Jerry Springer Show is seen on the television in the background.
 During the scene in which Janice and Ralphie are snorting cocaine in the bathroom, Janice comments "Oh Bartleby, Oh Humanity"  a reference to the drama surrounding Jackie Jr.'s death. This is the last line from Herman Melville's short story "Bartleby, the Scrivener."

Music
 The song played at the episode's beginning and over the end credits is "World Destruction" by Time Zone (with John Lydon).
 An early version of the episode's script had it open with the song "If You Don't Know Me By Now" by Harold Melvin & the Blue Notes.
 The song played while two women make out on a hotel bed is "Do You Wanna Get Heavy?" by Jon Spencer Blues Explosion.
 The song playing while Bobby and Tony are eating in the diner is "Theme from A Summer Place" by Percy Faith.
The song playing while Christopher smokes a heroin-laden cigarette with one of the Icelandic Air Flight Attendants is "Something Something" by Coo Coo Cal.
 The song played while Christopher shoots up is "My Rifle, My Pony, and Me", sung by Dean Martin in Rio Bravo (1959).
 The song playing while Det. Lt. Haydu pulls into his driveway is "Lady Marmalade" by Labelle.
 The song playing when Carmela sees Angie in the supermarket is "Saturday in the Park" by Chicago from their album Chicago V''.

References

External links
"For All Debts Public and Private" at HBO

The Sopranos (season 4) episodes
2002 American television episodes
Television episodes directed by Allen Coulter
Television episodes written by David Chase